The 2016 Vanderbilt Commodores baseball team represented Vanderbilt University during the 2016 NCAA Division I baseball season. The Commodores play their home games at Hawkins Field as a member of the Eastern Division of the Southeastern Conference. They are led by head coach Tim Corbin, in his 14th season at Vanderbilt. The Commodores compiled a 40–15 regular season record, going 18–12 in the SEC and finishing ranked #10 in the nation. The Commodores earned a #6 seed in the 2016 Southeastern Conference tournament, where they went 2–2 and were eliminated by Texas A&M, the eventual champions. Following the SEC tournament, the Commodores hosted a regional in the NCAA Division I Baseball Tournament, part of the Louisville super regional. The season was marred by the death of freshman pitcher Donny Everett, who drowned the day before Vanderbilt was to take on Xavier University in their first regional game. Vanderbilt went 0–2 in the Nashville regional to end the season, falling to Xavier and Washington.

Previous season
After a slow start to the 2015 season, the Commodores easily qualified for the 2015 Southeastern Conference tournament, where they finished second to the Florida Gators.  They then played host to the 2015 NCAA Nashville Regional, where they defeated Lipscomb University and Radford University, the latter by a record-tying shutout score of 21–0.  The Commodores then faced the University of Illinois in the NCAA Superegional, defeating them in a two-game sweep and advancing to the College World Series. In their opening-round game in the 2015 College World Series, Vanderbilt defeated , 4–3, on a walkoff home run in the bottom of the ninth in a game that had been suspended due to rain the night before, advancing into the winners' bracket. In their second-round game, Vanderbilt defeated the number 7 national seed TCU, 1–0. Zander Wiel hit a home run in the 7th inning to score the lone run of the game and break up a no-hitter. Behind an offensive outburst and dominating performance behind the arm of Walker Buehler, the Commodores beat TCU 7–1 to advance to their second straight College World Series Championship Series. In game 1 of the championship series Vanderbilt defeated Virginia 5–1 thanks to an outing by Carson Fulmer. Virginia held Vanderbilt scoreless (3–0) for just the second time all year, forcing a winner-take-all third game for the national championship. The Cavaliers beat Vanderbilt 4–2 to win their first baseball national championship in program history.

Donny Everett

Vanderbilt freshman pitcher Donny Everett drowned at Normandy Lake, in Manchester, Tennessee, on June 2, 2016, just one day before the Commodores were to play Xavier to enter the NCAA Division I baseball tournament. According to officials, Everett was fishing with four friends when he decided to attempt to swim from the west side to the east side of Fire Lake Bridge. Halfway through, Everett began noticing problems and notified his friends for help, but they thought he was "joking around" because he didn't seem to be in distress. The report stated one of the four swam in to help Everett, by which he stated he wasn't a good swimmer and struggling to stay afloat. He looked back, but Everett had gone under and wasn't coming up-shore. Officials sent a deputy and an ambulance at 5:00 PM to the lake for "a subject that had gone underwater". Deputies recovered his body at 6:49 PM, and he was sent to the state medical examiner in Nashville. He was 19 years old.  Everett won the 2015 Gatorade Player of the Year, and was drafted in the 29th round last year by the Milwaukee Brewers out of Clarkville High School in Clarkville, Tennessee. He finished this season with a 0–1 record and a 1.50 ERA, as well as 13 strikeouts in 12 innings. After Everett's death, Vanderbilt University released a statement saying that "...the team, the athletic department and the university are trying to come to terms with this tragedy." As a result of Everett's untimely death, many NCAA baseball teams, including Ole Miss and LSU, paid tribute by holding a moment of silence and writing Everett's initials on their equipment. The NCAA offered to postpone Vanderbilt's June 3 game against Xavier but the Commodores planned to play, with Coach Corbin calling the baseball field "their safe haven." The game was eventually postponed due to rain.

Personnel

Roster

Coaching staff

Schedule

Record vs. conference opponents

References

Vanderbilt
Vanderbilt Commodores baseball seasons
Vanderbilt
Vanderbilt Commodores baseball